North Carolina Highway 3 (NC 3) is a primary state highway in the U.S. state of North Carolina. The road runs from US 601 in southern Concord, north through Mooresville to US 29 in Kannapolis. It is numbered after Dale Earnhardt, the NASCAR driver, who was driving the #3 car when he died at the 2001 Daytona 500.  This state highway runs from Kannapolis, Earnhardt's birthplace, to downtown Mooresville, where many NASCAR teams are based.  A short section of NC 3 is named Dale Earnhardt Boulevard, a name which was given to the road prior to Earnhardt's death.

Route description
NC 3's southern terminus is in Concord, at US 601, where it follows Union Street northwards from a fork in the road just north of where US 601 has an interchange with NC 49. The route continues on to Branchview Drive upon crossing Old Airport Road, bypassing downtown Concord to the east. The name changes again to Concord Lake Road upon crossing over I-85; there is no interchange with I-85, just an overpass. Turning left onto Dale Earnhardt Boulevard, it follows that road northeast, shortly reaching an oblique intersection with US 29. The road continues through the downtown area of Kannapolis, crossing Main Street and then NC 3 turns on to Mooresville Road, heading in a generally east-southeast direction.

Leaving Kannapolis near the Fisher Town neighborhood, the road crosses the northern tip of the Don T. Howell Reservoir, then curves to the north.  At Earnhardt Lake Road, the name changes to Coddle Creek Highway.  After crossing several miles of mostly rural area, it passes the headquarters of Dale Earnhardt, Inc. shortly before entering the corporate limits of Mooresville.  Within Mooresville, it follows Iredell Avenue before reaching its northern terminus at NC 150.

History

In 1934, NC 3 was signed as a short  route on Buck Island traveling from US 158 to the Currituck Sound in Currituck County. 

On October 23, 2002, Governor Mike Easley signed into law a bill officially reassigning NC 136 to NC 3's route and vice versa.  NC 3 was moved because it was the hometown of the aforementioned Dale Earnhardt who died in the 2001 Daytona 500.  Earnhardt drove the #3 Goodwrench Chevrolet and grew up in the Mooresville region.  NC 136 now follows the old NC 3 route.

Major intersections

References

External links

 
 NCRoads.com: N.C. 3

Transportation in Cabarrus County, North Carolina
Transportation in Iredell County, North Carolina
003
Dale Earnhardt